Byron Murphy Jr. (born January 18, 1998) is an American football cornerback for the Minnesota Vikings of the National Football League (NFL). He played college football at Washington.

Early years
Murphy attended Saguaro High School in Scottsdale, Arizona. He played cornerback and wide receiver. As a senior, he had 88 receptions for 1,733 yards and 21 touchdowns on offense and 52 tackles and seven interceptions on defense. Murphy committed to the University of Washington to play college football.

College career
After redshirting his first year at Washington in 2016, Murphy played in six games with six starts in 2017, missing seven due to injury. He finished the season with 16 tackles and three interceptions. He returned to Washington as a starter in 2018. He was awarded the MVP at the 2018 Pac-12 Football Championship Game after making two interceptions, one of which he returned for a 66-yard touchdown.  On January 7, 2019, Murphy announced that he would forgo his remaining two years of eligibility and declare for the 2019 NFL Draft.

College statistics

Professional career

Arizona Cardinals
Murphy was drafted by the Arizona Cardinals in the second round (33rd overall) of the 2019 NFL Draft.
In week 10 against the Tampa Bay Buccaneers, Murphy recorded his first career interception off Jameis Winston in the 30–27 loss.

In Week 7 of the 2020 season against the Seattle Seahawks on Sunday Night Football, Murphy recorded his first career sack on Russell Wilson during the 37–34 overtime win. He was placed on the reserve/COVID-19 list by the team on November 2, 2020, and activated on November 11.

Murphy entered the 2021 season as a starting cornerback for the Cardinals. In Week 3 of the 2021 season, he had two interceptions, including a 29-yard pick-six in a 31-19 win over the Jaguars, earning NFC Defensive Player of the Week. He finished the season with 64 tackles and a team-leading 12 passes defensed and four interceptions.

Murphy returned as a starting cornerback for the Cardinals in 2022. In Week 2, he returned a fumble forced by Isaiah Simmons 59 yards for the game-winning touchdown in a 29-23 overtime win against the Raiders. He finished the season with 36 tackles, four passes defensed, and two fumble recoveries through nine starts.

Minnesota Vikings
On March 15, 2023, Murphy signed a two-year contract with the Minnesota Vikings.

References

External links
 Sports Reference (college)
Arizona Cardinals bio
Washington Huskies bio

1998 births
Living people
21st-century African-American sportspeople
African-American players of American football
Players of American football from Scottsdale, Arizona
American football cornerbacks
Washington Huskies football players
Arizona Cardinals players
Minnesota Vikings players